The Freedom Tour was the fourth concert tour by American singer-songwriter Alicia Keys in support of her fourth studio album, The Element of Freedom (2009). The tour commenced at the Scotiabank Place in Ottawa on February 26, 2010. The tour continued onto North America visiting Europe as well. In June, Keys will headline one concert in Johannesburg, giving the singer in first performances in South Africa. According to Pollstar, the tour grossed $29.4 million worldwide, with 43 shows.

Background
Keys announced her forthcoming tour in December 2009, shortly after the release of her fourth studio album. During the same time, Keys was named R&B/Hip-Hop Artist of the Decade by Billboard magazine. When describing the tour, Keys mentions, The show is, obviously, always focused around music; that's what is always my main focus. When we first start putting it all together, it all starts at the music, and then it's what story that I want to tell and kind of what energy I want to give off. There's going to be something for everyone in this show because that's who I am, I am a person who feels things from all different angles and directions, and I'm going to express it that way ... and that's how I arm-wrestle people who are close-minded.

Opening acts
Robin Thicke (North America)
Melanie Fiona (North America and Europe)

Set list
{{hidden
| headercss = background: #ccccff; font-size: 100%; width: 65%;
| contentcss = text-align: left; font-size: 100%; width: 75%;
| header = North America
| content =

"Caged Bird"
"Love Is Blind"
"You Don't Know My Name" (contains elements of "Flashing Lights")
"Fallin'"
"Another Way To Die"
"Karma" (contain elements of "Once in a Lifetime")
"Heartburn"  (contains elements of "I Feel For You")
"I Need You"
"Pray for Forgiveness"
"Diary"
"Like You'll Never See Me Again"
"Wait Til You See My Smile"
"Go Ahead"
"Un-Thinkable (I'm Ready)"
"Try Sleeping with a Broken Heart"
"Superwoman"
"If I Ain't Got You"
"No One"
Encore
"Empire State of Mind (Part II) Broken Down"

}}

{{hidden
| headercss = background: #ccccff; font-size: 100%; width: 65%;
| contentcss = text-align: left; font-size: 100%; width: 75%;
| header = Europe
| content =

"Love Is Blind"
"You Don't Know My Name" (contains elements of "Flashing Lights")
"Fallin'"
"Go Ahead"
"Another Way to Die"
"Karma" (contain elements of "Once in a Lifetime")
"Pray for Forgiveness"
"Diary"
"If I Ain't Got You"
"Like You'll Never See Me Again"
"Wait Til You See My Smile"
"Try Sleeping with a Broken Heart"
"Superwoman"
"Unthinkable (I'm Ready)"
"Doesn't Mean Anything"
"No One"
Encore
"Empire State of Mind Part II (Broken Down)"

}}

Tour dates

Festivals and other miscellaneous performances
 This concert is a part of Festival Ischgl/Top of the Mountain Concert
This concert is part of the BBC Radio 1's Big Weekend Music Festival.
This concert is part of the FIFA World Cup Kick-off Celebration Concert.
This concert is part of the Essence Music Festival

Box office score data

References

2010 concert tours
Alicia Keys concert tours